Rite Parish is an administrative territorial entity of Jēkabpils Municipality in the Selonia region of Latvia. Prior to 2009, it was an administrative unit of the former Jēkabpils District. 
The administrative center is Cīruļi village.

Towns, villages and settlements of Rite Parish 
 Cīruļi
 Kacīte
 Rite

References

External links

Parishes of Latvia
Jēkabpils Municipality
Selonia